Mera Desh Mera Dharam is a 1973 Bollywood drama film directed by Dara Singh. The film stars Dara Singh and Raj Kapoor.

Soundtrack
Prem Dhawan composed and wrote all the songs.

"Luta Di Hasino Pe Jawani Luta Di" - Shaminder, Manna Dey
"Bhula Raha Tera Vatan Lut Raha Tera Chaman" - Manna Dey
"Bhula Raha Tera Vatan Lut Raha Tera Chaman" (version 2) - Manna Dey
"Lakho Ussey Salaam" - Asha Bhosle
"Matwali Raftar Qayamat Payal Ki Jhankar" - Usha Mangeshkar, Asha Bhosle
"Ruk Jaao O Jaani Ruk Jaao" - Asha Bhosle

References

External links
 

1973 films
1970s Hindi-language films
1973 drama films
Films directed by Dara Singh
Films scored by Prem Dhawan